The 2020 Summer Olympics torch relay was held from 12 March 2020 and ended on 23 July 2021. After being lit in Olympia, Greece, the torch was handed over to the Olympic shooting Gold medallist Anna Korakaki, who became the relay originating Olympian woman of the 2020 Summer Olympics torch relay. It was then transported to Athens on 19 March by official airliner Japan Airlines. The Japanese leg began in Fukushima, and is scheduled to end in Tokyo's New National Stadium, the main venue of the 2020 Olympics. It makes a tour of Japanese cities, including all 47 prefecture capitals. The torch is even scheduled to go to two remote island groups which are part of Tokyo. The end of the relay was the finale of the 2020 Summer Olympics opening ceremony on 23 July 2021. Toyota, NTT, ENEOS, Nippon Life, JAL, ANA and Japan Post Holdings are the presenting partners of the relay, with the slogan being "Hope Lights Our Way".

The torch relay was changed due to the COVID-19 pandemic. The planned relay leg through Greece was cancelled, and both the lighting ceremony in Olympia and the handover ceremony in Athens had no public attendance. The relay was suspended on 25 March 2020, a day before the Japanese relay was due to start, and the torch was moved to Tokyo for exhibition until the relay resumed as planned on 25 March 2021.

Torches 
The Olympic torch was designed by Tokujin Yoshioka and unveiled 19 March 2019; the design is inspired by cherry blossoms, with 5 petal-shaped columns around the tip of the torch, and a rose-gold "sakura gold" color finish. Their construction will incorporate aluminum recycled from unused shelters deployed in the aftermath of the 2011 Tōhoku earthquake and tsunami.

Route in Greece
The traditional lighting ceremony was held on 12 March 2020 at Olympia, Greece, and the torch was handed over to the first torchbearer, Anna Korakaki. Due to the COVID-19 pandemic, it was the first lighting ceremony since 1984 to be held without spectators. The handover ceremony was held at Panathenaic Stadium in Athens on 19 March. The torch was to visit 31 cities and 15 landmarks across Greece, but due to the coronavirus pandemic, it was cancelled. On 13 March, a small ceremony was held in Sparta, the notable torchbearer was Scottish actor Gerard Butler, known for playing Leonidas in the movie 300 in commemorating with the 2,500th anniversary of the Battle of Thermopylae.

12 March 2020: Olympia, Amaliada, Pyrgos, Kyparissia, Kalamata
13 March 2020 (rest of the day cancelled): Sparta, Tripoli, Nafplio, Megara, Piraeus
14 March 2020 (cancelled): Kastellorizo, Agios Nikolaos, Rethymno, Chania
15 March 2020 (cancelled): Thermopylae, Volos, Thessaloniki, Chania
16 March 2020 (cancelled): Kavala, Alexandroupoli
17 March 2020 (cancelled): Amphipolis, Vergina, Meteora
18 March 2020 (cancelled): Marathon, Sounion, Athens
19 March 2020: Panathenaic Stadium

Special display
As the damage from the 2011 Tōhoku earthquake and tsunami mostly affected three prefectures, Miyagi, Iwate and Fukushima, a special torch display known as "Flame of Recovery" will be held in these three prefectures. The flame first arrived at Matsushima Air Field before being displayed at the locations below.

20 March 2020: Ishinomaki Minamihama Tsunami Recovery Memorial Park, Ishinomaki
21 March 2020: Sendai Station, Sendai
22 March 2020: Sanriku Railway and the SL Ginga Steam Locomotive Express (between Miyako, Kamaishi and Hanamaki Stations)
23 March 2020: Kyassen Ofunato, Ōfunato
24 March 2020: Fukushima Station, Fukushima
25 March 2020: Aquamarine Fukushima, Iwaki

After the postponement of the Summer Olympics to 2021, the torch display remained in Fukushima for at least a month before subsequently moved to Tokyo. The Olympic Flame would be later placed on display at Japan Olympic Museum from 1 September 2020 until 30 November 2020. The restart of the relay took place on 25 March 2021 for the rescheduled Olympics.

Route in Japan

The original schedule of the torch relay in Japan was from 26 March to 24 July 2020. After the postponement of the Summer Olympics to 2021, all relays were delayed by 364 days (one day less than a full year to preserve the same days of the week). This change was not announced until 28 September 2020. The following table is taken from the original 2020 schedule:

Tokyo metropolitan leg

Ceremony changes
Due to the ongoing COVID-19 pandemic and several prefectures declared state of emergency amid COVID-19 surge, many of the public stages of the relay were truncated to be more ceremonial rather than functional such as alternative events. Participants of the relay would carry the torch for about 30 meters before passing the flame to another participant rather than carrying it for long stretches.

For instance, the relay in Osaka prefecture was changed into a private relay without passing spectators at Expo Commemoration Park in Suita. The relay in Matsuyama, Ehime was cancelled and changed onto a private relay, while the rest of Ehime Prefecture still had their relays on public roads as planned. Later relays in prefectures affected by COVID-19 as the virus cases increased but changed into a ceremonial lighting ceremony onto the designated final destination.

End of torch relay
In December 2018, organizers announced that, similar to what happened at the 2016 Summer Olympics, two cauldrons were built: one inside the Olympic Stadium and another on the waterfront, near the Dream Bridge. The function of the stadium cauldron was merely scenographic, to go according to what is established in the Olympic Charter. The Dream Bridge cauldron was placed where the flame will burn during the 16 days of the Games. It was lit right after the end of opening ceremony and will be extinguished a few moments before the closing ceremony starts, when the flame will return to the scenographic cauldron inside the stadium and will be burned for its last few moments. The decision to use a public cauldron came from the fact that it would not be possible to maintain the flame burning inside the stadium during the games.

At the 2020 Summer Olympics opening ceremony, the flame was transported to Japan National Stadium by judoka Tadahiro Nomura and wrestler Saori Yoshida, then the torch followed by the trio of baseball greats (Sadaharu Oh, Shigeo Nagashima and Hideki Matsui), until they passed to Hiroki Ohashi and Junko Kitagawa, a doctor and a nurse helped to save lives during the pandemic as they carried the flame to Paralympian and wheelchair marathoner Wakako Tsuchida as passed to a group of students from Iwate, Miyagi and Fukushima Prefectures who were born before the Tōhoku earthquake and tsunami until they handed the torch to tennis player Naomi Osaka, who would go on to light the Olympic cauldron; during the Olympics, Osaka would compete for Japan in the women's tennis competition before being eliminated in the third round.

References

External links

 Tokyo 2020 Olympic Torch Relay official website

Torch Relay, 2020 Summer Olympics
Olympic torch relays